The Norland was a P&O roll-on/roll-off ferry operating between Kingston upon Hull in Yorkshire, UK, and Rotterdam Europoort, Netherlands, and then Zeebrugge, Belgium. The 27,000 tonne ferry was built in 1974 by AG Weser, Bremerhaven, for Dutch North Sea Ferries partners Noordzee Veerdiensten N.V. Sistership  sailed under Dutch flag and Norland under British flag and with (mainly) British crew. The ship transferred to P&O North Sea Ferries in 1996.

Falklands Service
During the Falklands War, the Ministry of Defence requisitioned the Norland to be used as a troopship in the Task Force sent to retake the Falkland Islands from Argentina. Norland was among the ships to enter San Carlos Water during the amphibious landings of Commandos and Paratroopers, Captained by Donald Ellerby CBE. The ship survived attack from the Argentine Air Force, and at the end of the war repatriated the defeated Argentine troops back home, alongside the Canberra. For this service Norland received the battle honour "Falkland Islands 1982," which for many years was displayed in one of the passenger lounges, with a painting of the ship in San Carlos Water.

Post P&O
In 2002, the Norland was sold to SNAV as the SNAV Sicilia for service between Naples and Palermo.

The ship was broken up in India in the summer of 2010.

Popular culture
She was seen in the BBC TV Only Fools and Horses episode To Hull and Back, when the Trotter family used her as a means of navigation.

References

Falklands War naval ships of the United Kingdom
Ferries of the United Kingdom
History of Kingston upon Hull
1973 ships
Ships built in Bremen (state)
Ships of P&O Ferries